A subverted rhyme, teasing rhyme or mind rhyme is the suggestion of a rhyme which is left unsaid and must be inferred by the listener. A rhyme may be subverted either by stopping short, or by replacing the expected word with another (which may have the same rhyme or not). Teasing rhyme is a form of innuendo, where the unsaid word is taboo or completes a sentence indelicately.

An example, in the context of cheerleading:

where the presumption is that the listener anticipates the chant ending with "ass" rather than "other knee".

Subverted rhyme is often a form of word play.  The implied rhyme is inferable only from the context. This contrasts with rhyming slang from which the rhyming portion has been clipped, which is part of the lexicon. (An example is dogs, meaning "feet", a clipping of rhyming dog's meat.)

Examples
A traditional example is the song "Sweet Violets" from 1951, which begins:

Alan Bold described the 20th century anonymous bawdy poem about the "young man of Brighton Pier" as "perhaps the finest of the teasing-rhyme variety of bawdy poem". An extract will illustrate the technique:

"Something You Can Do with Your Finger" from South Park uses enjambment to replace taboo words with non-taboo phrases with the same initial syllable. For example shit>shih-tzu and meat>meeting, in the following fragment, each start a new sentence instead of finishing the old one:

Similarly, the childhood rhyme "Miss Suzie" ends each section with what sounds like a taboo word, only to continue with a more innocent word.

Another example is the 1985 Bowser and Blue song "Polka-Dot Undies", which begins:

The 2003 song "Mr. Brightside" by The Killers transitions from the verses to the chorus with a mind rhyme of dick:

In the 2001 movie Shrek, the song welcome to duloc sang by the duloc dolls greeting shrek uses a subverted rhyme with a mind rhyme of ass

History
Teasing rhymes have been popular since the 17th century. Though fairly rare in canonical literature, examples of mind rhyme can be found in the work of William Shakespeare, Emily Dickinson, Marianne Moore and others. In Lewis Carroll's 'Tis the Voice of the Lobster it is generally assumed that the last words of the interrupted poem could be supplied by the reader as "— eating the Owl".

See also
 Crambo
 Mondegreen
 Rhyming slang
 Roses Are Red

References
 Abrams, M. H., A Glossary of Literary Terms, 2004.

Notes

Rhyme
Humorous poems
Word play
Off-color humor